Alexander J. Michaels (born October 16, 1983), stage name Alexis Michelle, is an American drag queen and singer who came to international attention on the ninth season of RuPaul's Drag Race. As of 2019, he stars in the TLC transformational makeover television series Dragnificent as the makeup and body image expert. He released his debut album, Lovefool, in 2018.

Early life 
Michaels was raised in New York City. He attended the Interlochen Center for the Arts and received a BFA in musical theatre from the University of Michigan.

He started doing drag when he was 10 years old and had paid professional gigs starting in 2003. His cousin is singer Lisa Loeb. He comes from a Jewish descent. He comes from the same drag mother as season 10 contestant Dusty Ray Bottoms. He was seen wearing a Dusty T-shirt in the workroom in one of the episodes of season nine, and Bottoms wore an Alexis T-shirt in season 10. He auditioned for Drag Race eight times before being selected for season nine.

Career 
He originated a role in the one-act campy comedy show, Rags to B***hes: A Battle of Wits & Wigs. Alexis Michelle was announced as one of fourteen contestants competing on the ninth season of RuPaul's Drag Race on February 2, 2017. She was the winner of the annual "Snatch Game" challenge in episode six, portraying Liza Minnelli. He was in the bottom two in the comedy challenge two episodes later and eliminated Farrah Moan to a lip sync of Dolly Parton's "Baby I'm Burning". In episode eleven, he was in the bottom two again with Peppermint, and lost a lip sync to the Village People's "Macho Man", placing Michelle in fifth.

He frequently performs at the Feinstein/54 Below cabaret with his Broadway show "Alexis, I Am!".

Michelle appeared with BeBe Zahara Benet, Jujubee and Thorgy Thor in the TLC show Drag Me Down the Aisle which aired on March 9, 2019. The special was subsequently given a full series order under the new name Dragnificent! and is set to premiere in April 2020.

Michelle is the drag mother of Jan Sport, who placed eighth in the twelfth season of RuPaul's Drag Race.

Music 
Michelle teamed with Sasha Velour, Aja and Peppermint for the single "C.L.A.T." in April 2017.

Michelle released his ten-track debut album, Lovefool, on May 11, 2018. A music video for the single of the same name, a cover of the 1996 song by The Cardigans, was available on May 17, 2018.

Filmography

Television

Web series

Music videos

Discography

Albums

Singles

See also
 LGBT culture in New York City
 List of LGBT people from New York City

References

External links 

 
 

Living people
American drag queens
American Jews
American male singers
Alexis Michelle
University of Michigan School of Music, Theatre & Dance alumni
1983 births